Fossarus is a genus of sea snails, marine gastropod mollusks in the family Planaxidae.

Species
Species within the genus Fossarus include:

 Fossarus abjectus (C.B. Adams, 1852)
 Fossarus ambiguus (Linnaeus, 1758)
 Fossarus angiostoma (C.B. Adams, 1852)
 Fossarus angulatus Carpenter, 1857
 Fossarus atratus (C.B. Adams, 1852)
 Fossarus beccarii (Tapparone Canefri, 1875)
 Fossarus bellus Dall, 1889
 Fossarus brumalis Hedley, 1907
 Fossarus cancellarius Melvill, 1918 
 Fossarus capensis Pilsbry, 1901
 Fossarus cereus Watson, 1880
 Fossarus cumingii (A. Adams, 1855)
 Fossarus dentifer E. A. Smith, 1890
 Fossarus elegans Verrill & Smith, 1882
 Fossarus erythraoensis: taxon inquirendum
 Fossarus eutorniscus Melvill, 1918 
 Fossarus excavatus (C.B. Adams, 1852)
 Fossarus fischeri Mörch, 1877
 Fossarus foveatus (C.B. Adams, 1852)
 Fossarus garrettii Pease, 1868
 Fossarus guayaquilensis Bartsch, 1928
 Fossarus japonicus (A. Adams, 1861)
 Fossarus laeviusculus E. A. Smith, 1890
 Fossarus lamellosus Mountrouzier, 1861 
 Fossarus lucanus Dall, 1919
 Fossarus lui S.-I Huang, 2012
 Fossarus macmurdensis (Hedley, 1911)
 Fossarus mediocris de Folin, 1867
 Fossarus megasoma (C.B. Adams, 1852)
 Fossarus orbignyi P. Fischer, 1864
 Fossarus porcatus (Philippi, 1845)
 Fossarus purus Carpenter, 1864
 Fossarus sydneyensis Hedley, 1900
 Fossarus tornatilis (Gould, 1859)
 Fossarus translucens Barnard, 1969 
 Fossarus trochlearis A. Adams, 1853 
 Fossarus tuberosus Carpenter, 1857

Species brought into synonymy
 Fossarus adansoni Philippi, 1841: synonym of Fossarus ambiguus (Linnaeus, 1758)
 Fossarus aptus Melvill, 1912: synonym of Fossarus ambiguus (Linnaeus, 1758)
 Fossarus bulimoides Tenison Woods, 1877: synonym of Leucotina casta (A. Adams, 1853)
 Fossarus clathratus Philippi, 1844: synonym of Clathrella clathrata (Philippi, 1844)
 Fossarus (Gottoina) compacta Dall, 1889: synonym of Haplocochlias compactus (Dall, 1889) 
 Fossarus depressus Seguenza, 1876: synonym of Megalomphalus disciformis (Granata-Grillo, 1877)
 Fossarus disciformis Granata-Grillo, 1877: synonym of Megalomphalus disciformis (Granata-Grillo, 1877)
 Fossarius doliaris A. Adams, 1863: synonym of Conradia doliaris A. Adams, 1863
 Fossarus excavatus Gaglini, 1987: synonym of Rugulina monterosatoi (van Aartsen & Bogi, 1987)
 Fossarus globulosus Turton, 1932: synonym of Couthouyia incerta (Turton, 1932)
 Fossarus granulum Brugnone, 1873: synonym of Pseudorbis granulum (Brugnone, 1873)
 Fossarus hyalinus Odhner, 1924: synonym of Scrupus hyalinus (Odhner, 1924)
 Fossarus incertus Turton, 1932: synonym of Couthouyia incerta (Turton, 1932)
 Fossarus iwateanus Nomura & Hatai, 1935: synonym of Phasianema lirata (A. Adams, 1860)
 Fossarus lanoei Baudon, 1857: synonym of Fossarus ambiguus (Linnaeus, 1758)
 Fossarus monterosati Granata-Grillo, 1877: synonym of Tjaernoeia exquisita (Jeffreys, 1883)
 Fossarus parcipictus Carpenter, 1864: synonym of Echinolittorina parcipicta (Carpenter, 1864)
 Fossarus petitianus Tiberi, 1869: synonym of Megalomphalus petitianus (Tiberi, 1869)
 Fossarus saxicola (C.B. Adams, 1852): synonym of Elachisina saxicola (C. B. Adams, 1852)
 Fossarus yamamotoi Habe, 1978: synonym of Macromphalus yamamotoi (Habe, 1978)

References

 Warén A. & Bouchet P. (1988) A new species of Vanikoridae from the western Mediterranean, with remarks on the Northeast Atlantic species of the family. Bollettino Malacologico 24(5-8): 73-100
 Gofas, S.; Le Renard, J.; Bouchet, P. (2001). Mollusca, in: Costello, M.J. et al. (Ed.) (2001). European register of marine species: a check-list of the marine species in Europe and a bibliography of guides to their identification. Collection Patrimoines Naturels, 50: pp. 180–213

External links

Planaxidae

Taxa named by Rodolfo Amando Philippi